Woxsen School of Business, established in 2014, as an autonomous institution and declared as Woxsen University (WOU) on 20 May 2020.

References

External links
Official website

Educational institutions established in 2014